Travis James Wear (born September 21, 1990) is an American former professional basketball player. He began his pro career with the New York Knicks after going undrafted in 2014.

Wear was an All-American in high school and won a silver medal with United States U-18 national team at the FIBA Americas Under-18 Championship in 2008. He played college basketball for the North Carolina Tar Heels and the UCLA Bruins. After playing one season with the Knicks, Wear played with San Sebastián Gipuzkoa BC in Spain for a year before returning to the U.S. to play with the Los Angeles D-Fenders.

High school career
Wear attended Mater Dei High School in Santa Ana, California where he was a two-time California Interscholastic Federation State champion in 2007 and 2008. As a junior, he averaged 16.1 points and 8.3 rebounds per game. As a senior, he averaged 14.9 points and 6.4 rebounds per game.

Considered a four-star recruit by Rivals.com, Wear was listed as the No. 17 power forward and the No. 60 player in the nation in 2009.

College career

North Carolina
Wear and his twin brother, David, played for the defending national champion North Carolina Tar Heels in their freshman year. Wear contributed 3.5 points and 2.2 rebounds a game while averaging over 10 minutes per game. The Tar Heels missed the National Collegiate Athletic Association (NCAA) tournament, which upset their fans. Wear said playing for North Carolina "wasn't what [he] thought it would be." The twin brothers transferred after the season in May 2010 to UCLA.  They redshirted the following season due to NCAA transfer rules.

UCLA

In his first season playing for UCLA in 2011–12, Wear played in 30 games with 24 starts, and averaged 26.2 minutes per game and finished second on the team in points per game (11.5) and rebounds per game (5.9). He had a career-high 13 rebounds in a loss against St. John's on February 5, 2012. In 2012–13, he started in 31 of his 32 games, and averaged 10.9 points and 5.2 rebounds in 28.9 minutes. He scored a career-high 23 points in a win at Colorado on January 12, 2013. UCLA won the Pac-12 Conference championship that season. However, UCLA coach Ben Howland was fired after the season, prompting Wear and his brother to consider transferring. After meeting with incoming coach Steve Alford, the brothers were convinced they fit as starters in the new coach's system.

Wear missed the first three games of 2013–14 after he had an appendectomy on October 28, 2013. He came off the bench in his first six games before returning to the starting lineup. He was ninth in the Pac-12 in field goal percentage (53.0), and shot 44% on three-point field goals—including 10 of 19 in his final 16 games. He scored a season-high 16 points on 8-for-8 shooting in UCLA's win over Stanford in the Pac-12 tournament semifinals. At the team's annual banquet at the end of the season, Wear was presented with the Elvin C. Ducky Drake Memorial Award as the team member who exhibits tremendous competitive spirit, inspiration and unselfish contributions. He graduated after the season.

Professional career

New York Knicks (2014–2015)

Wear thought he had a chance to be selected in the second round of the 2014 NBA draft, but he went undrafted. He played for the Atlanta Hawks in the 2014 NBA Summer League, and was signed by the New York Knicks on September 9, 2014. The Knicks' roster already had 15 players with guaranteed contracts, and Wear was a longshot to make the team. However, they opened a roster spot for Wear by trading Travis Outlaw. Knicks president Phil Jackson said Wear was "overshadowed at UCLA but has the skill set to play every position from 1 to 4." He added that the team planned to have Wear play in the NBA Development League, "where his possible NBA future solely depends on his ability to learn how to defend." The Knicks lost their 2014–15 season opener in a 104–80 blowout to the Chicago Bulls, but Wear made his pro debut in the fourth quarter with the game already decided. The following night against the Cleveland Cavaliers, he played 13 minutes in a 95–90 win, and held LeBron James to 0-for-4 shooting when he was the primary defender on James.

On January 8, 2015, Wear scored a season-high 21 points in a 120–96 loss to Houston Rockets. On March 22, 2015, he left the game against the Toronto Raptors with lower back soreness. He missed the final 12 games of the season with the injury. He finished his rookie season averaging 3.9 points and 2.1 rebounds in 51 games.

Gipuzkoa Basket (2015–2016) 
On October 7, 2015, Wear signed with Gipuzkoa Basket of the Liga ACB. In 26 games, he averaged 7.5 points, 4.2 rebounds and 0.7 blocks in 20.5 minutes.

Los Angeles D-Fenders / South Bay Lakers (2016–2018)
On September 1, 2016, Wear signed with the Los Angeles Lakers, but was waived on October 12 after appearing in two preseason games. He played 2016–17 with the Los Angeles D-Fenders of the NBA Development League as an affiliate player of the Lakers, and averaged 12.7 points and 7.3 rebounds per game.

Wear played with the Lakers in the 2017 summer league, and again joined the NBA team for their training camp.

Wear spent most of the season with the NBA G League South Bay Lakers.

Los Angeles Lakers (2018) 
Wear signed a 10-day contract with the Los Angeles Lakers on March 2, 2018. Two days later, he made his Los Angeles debut against the San Antonio Spurs, playing the entire fourth quarter and scoring seven points with two rebounds to help the team rally to a 116–112 win. After his second 10-day contract expired later that month, Wear signed a deal for the remainder of the season and was assigned twice to South Bay. During the offseason, the Lakers signed Wear to a two-way contract for 2018–19. However, they waived him after the first game of the season to sign forward Johnathan Williams to a two-way deal.

Return to South Bay (2018–2020)
On November 27, 2018, the South Bay Lakers announced they had acquired Wear as a returning player. In January 2020, he suffered a season-ending injury.

Career statistics

NBA

Regular season

|-
| style="text-align:left;"| 
| style="text-align:left;"| New York
| 51 || 1 || 13.2 || .402 || .367 || .769 || 2.1 || .8 || .3 || .2 || 3.9
|-
| style="text-align:left;"| 
| style="text-align:left;"| L.A. Lakers
| 17 || 0 || 13.4 || .347 || .362 || 1.000 || 2.2 || .4 || .2 || .3 || 4.4
|- class="sortbottom"
| style="text-align:center;" colspan="2"| Career
| 68 || 1 || 13.2 || .388 || .364 || .824 || 2.1 || .7 || .3 || .2 || 4.0

Liga ACB

|-
| style="text-align:left;"| 2015–16
| style="text-align:left;"| RETAbet.es GBC
| 26 || 13 || 20.5 || .448 || .353 || .737 || 4.2 || .5 || .7 || .1 || 7.5
|- class="sortbottom"
| style="text-align:center;" colspan="2"| Career
| 26 || 13 || 20.5 || .448 || .353 || .737 || 4.2 || .5 || .7 || .1 || 7.5

College

|-
| style="text-align:left;"| 2009–10
| style="text-align:left;"| North Carolina
| 32 || 1 || 10.1 || .413 || .400 || .742 || 2.2 || .2 || .3 || .1 || 3.5
|-
| style="text-align:left;"| 2011–12
| style="text-align:left;"| UCLA
| 30 || 24 || 26.2 || .533 || .429 || .791 || 5.9 || .4 || .7 || 1.2 || 11.5
|-
| style="text-align:left;"| 2012–13
| style="text-align:left;"| UCLA
| 32 || 31 || 28.8 || .493 || .308 || .815 || 5.2 || .5 || .7 || 1.0 || 10.9
|-
| style="text-align:left;"| 2013–14
| style="text-align:left;"| UCLA
| 34 || 28 || 23.9 || .530 || .440 || .833 || 3.2 || 1.4 || .7 || .7 || 7.2
|- class="sortbottom"
| style="text-align:center;" colspan="2"| Career
| 128 || 84 || 22.2 || .504 || .400 || .798 || 4.1 || .7 || .6 || .7 || 8.2

Personal life
Wear is the son of David Sr. and Gloria Wear. His father played college basketball at Fresno State and Cal State Fullerton and professionally overseas. Wear's favorite basketball player of all time is Earvin "Magic" Johnson. His twin brother, David also became a professional basketball player.

References

External links

 UCLA Bruins bio
 OCVarsity.com profile
 

1990 births
Living people
American expatriate basketball people in Spain
American men's basketball players
Basketball players from Long Beach, California
Gipuzkoa Basket players
Liga ACB players
Los Angeles D-Fenders players
Los Angeles Lakers players
McDonald's High School All-Americans
New York Knicks players
North Carolina Tar Heels men's basketball players
Parade High School All-Americans (boys' basketball)
Small forwards
South Bay Lakers players
American twins
Twin sportspeople
UCLA Bruins men's basketball players
Undrafted National Basketball Association players
United States men's national basketball team players